Mägestiku is a village in Otepää Parish, Valga County in southeastern Estonia. It has a population of 50 (as of 7 February 2008).

References

Villages in Valga County